The GP Explorer or Grand Prix Explorer is a Formula 4 car competition bringing together 22 Internet personalities organized by the french YouTuber Squeezie.

The first edition was held on October 8, 2022 at the Circuit Bugatti in Le Mans. Broadcast live on Twitch, it became the most viewed French Twitch stream, reaching a peak of over one million viewers and averaging 400,000.

History 

Originally a challenge during the ZEvent 2020, the first edition was held on October 8, 2022 at the Bugatti Circuit in Le Mans, bringing together 22 French web streamers and YouTubers, divided into eleven teams. Participating streamers trained for several months, with some such as Seb la Frite obtaining racing licenses.

The first race was won by Sylvain Levy (from the duo Vilebrequin), with Depielo and Etienne Moustache completing the podium.

Prize list

Per year

Driver

Car racing team

Classification

Key facts

Accident 
During qualifying, Joyca was involved in a major accident at the exit of the Dunlop curve which severely damaged his car. The mechanics managed to repair the car and the videographer was able to start the race. He reacts: "I got there, in the big Dunlop of death, there's a wall that's a little scary, well I took it."

Personalities invited 
In 2022, the third position trophy was given by Matthieu Vaxiviere, the second position by Bigflo & Oli and the winning trophy by Jamel Debbouze.

Around the race

Number of spectators per year 

In 2022, the event broadcast live on Twitch gathered just over one million concurrent viewers, becoming the most viewed French stream one of the top 10 most viewed streams on the platform.

Symbols

Logotype

References

External links 

Auto races in France
Auto races